WMXT (102.1 FM), known as "102.1 The Fox", is a classic hits music-formatted radio station in the Florence, South Carolina, United States, market.

History
Mix 102.1 was an adult contemporary radio station which aired Paul Harvey.

Cumulus Media bought classic rock WHSC-FM 98.5, alternative rock WBZF 100.5, and WMXT. Classic rock and John Boy and Billy moved to WMXT, which had the strongest signal at 50,000 watts.

References

External links
WMXT Official Website

MXT
Radio stations established in 1990
Cumulus Media radio stations